George Cary (August 7, 1789 – September 10, 1843) was a United States representative from Georgia.  He was born near Allens Fresh, Charles County, Maryland. He received a classical education and studied law. He was admitted to the bar and commenced practice in Frederick, Maryland. He was also engaged in agricultural pursuits.

Cary moved to Appling, Georgia. He was a member of the Georgia House of Representatives 1819–1821. He was elected in 1822 as a Crawford Republican to the 18th United States Congress and a Jacksonian to the 19th Congress (March 4, 1823 – March 3, 1827). He engaged in the newspaper business and edited the Hickory Nut. He was again a member of the Georgia House of Representatives in 1834. He died in Thomaston, Georgia, in 1843 and was buried in the Methodist Churchyard.

References

1789 births
1843 deaths
People from Charles County, Maryland
Members of the Georgia House of Representatives
Maryland lawyers
Politicians from Frederick, Maryland
Democratic-Republican Party members of the United States House of Representatives from Georgia (U.S. state)
Jacksonian members of the United States House of Representatives from Georgia (U.S. state)
People from Columbia County, Georgia
19th-century American newspaper editors
American slave owners
19th-century American politicians